In mathematics, an embedding (or imbedding) is one instance of some mathematical structure contained within another instance, such as a group that is a subgroup.

When some object  is said to be embedded in another object , the embedding is given by some injective and structure-preserving map . In the terminology of category theory, a structure-preserving map is called a morphism.

The fact that a map  is an embedding is often indicated by the use of a "hooked arrow"; thus:  (On the other hand, this notation is sometimes reserved for inclusion maps.)

In many cases of interest there is a standard (or "canonical") embedding, like those of the natural numbers in the integers, the integers in the rational numbers, the rational numbers in the real numbers, and the real numbers in the complex numbers.

Topology and geometry

General topology

In general topology, an embedding is a homeomorphism onto its image. Every embedding is injective and continuous. Every map that is injective, continuous and either open or closed is an embedding; however there are also embeddings which are neither open nor closed.

This allows two spaces to be distinguished if one is able to be embedded in a space while the other is not.

Related definitions

If the domain of a function  is a topological space then the function is said to be  if there exists some neighborhood  of this point such that the restriction  is injective. It is called  if it is locally injective around every point of its domain.

Every injective function is locally injective but not conversely. Local diffeomorphisms, local homeomorphisms, and smooth immersions are all locally injective functions that are not necessarily injective. The inverse function theorem gives a sufficient condition for a continuously differentiable function to be (among other things) locally injective. Every fiber of a locally injective function  is necessarily a discrete subspace of its domain

Differential topology

In differential topology:
Let  and  be smooth manifolds and  be a smooth map. Then  is called an immersion if its derivative is everywhere injective. An embedding, or a smooth embedding, is defined to be an immersion which is an embedding in the topological sense mentioned above (i.e. homeomorphism onto its image). 
 
In other words, the domain of an embedding is diffeomorphic to its image, and in particular the image of an embedding must be a submanifold. An immersion is precisely a local embedding, i.e. for any point  there is a neighborhood  such that  is an embedding.

When the domain manifold is compact, the notion of a smooth embedding is equivalent to that of an injective immersion.

The Whitney embedding theorem states that  is enough, and is the best possible linear bound. For example, the real projective space  of dimension , where  is a power of two, requires  for an embedding. The Roman surface fails to be an immersion as it contains cross-caps.

An embedding is proper if it behaves well with respect to boundaries: one requires the map  to be such that

, and

Riemannian and pseudo-Riemannian geometry

In Riemannian geometry and pseudo-Riemannian geometry:
Let  and  be Riemannian manifolds or more generally pseudo-Riemannian manifolds.
Explicitly, for any two tangent vectors  we have

Analogously, isometric immersion is an immersion between (pseudo)-Riemannian manifolds which preserves the (pseudo)-Riemannian metrics.

Equivalently, in Riemannian geometry, an isometric embedding (immersion) is a smooth embedding (immersion) which preserves length of curves (cf. Nash embedding theorem).

Algebra

Field theory

In field theory, an embedding of a field  in a field  is a ring homomorphism .

Furthermore, it is a well-known property of fields that their only ideals are the zero ideal and the whole field itself. This justifies the name embedding for an arbitrary homomorphism of fields.

Universal algebra and model theory

  is injective,
 for every -ary function symbol  and  we have ,
 for every -ary relation symbol  and  we have  iff 

In model theory there is also a stronger notion of elementary embedding.

Order theory and domain theory
In order theory, an embedding of partially ordered sets is a function  between partially ordered sets  and  such that

Injectivity of 
follows quickly from this definition. In domain theory, an additional requirement is that

 is directed.

Metric spaces

A mapping  of metric spaces is called an embedding
(with distortion ) if

for every  and some constant .

Normed spaces 

An important special case is that of normed spaces; in this case it is natural to consider linear embeddings.

One of the basic questions that can be asked about a finite-dimensional normed space  is, what is the maximal dimension  such that the Hilbert space  can be linearly embedded into  with constant distortion?

The answer is given by Dvoretzky's theorem.

Category theory

In category theory, there is no satisfactory and generally accepted definition of embeddings that is applicable in all categories. One would expect that all isomorphisms and all compositions of embeddings are embeddings, and that all embeddings are monomorphisms. Other typical requirements are: any extremal monomorphism is an embedding and embeddings are stable under pullbacks.

Ideally the class of all embedded subobjects of a given object, up to isomorphism, should also be small, and thus an ordered set. In this case, the category is said to be well powered with respect to the class of embeddings. This allows defining new local structures in the category (such as a closure operator).

A factorization system for a category also gives rise to a notion of embedding. Concrete theories often have a factorization system in which  consists of the embeddings in the previous sense. This is the case of the majority of the examples given in this article.

As usual in category theory, there is a dual concept, known as quotient. All the preceding properties can be dualized.

An embedding can also refer to an embedding functor.

See also
Ambient space
Closed immersion
Cover
Dimension reduction
Flat (geometry)
Immersion
Johnson–Lindenstrauss lemma
Submanifold
Subspace
Universal space

Notes

References 
 
 
 

 
 
 

 
 .
 
 .

External links 

 Embedding of manifolds on the Manifold Atlas

Abstract algebra
Category theory
General topology
Differential topology
Functions and mappings
Maps of manifolds
Model theory
Order theory